Pravda.ru formerly Pravda Online, is a Russian news website established in 1999 and owned by Pravda.ru Holding headed by Vadim Gorshenin.

History
After the collapse of the Soviet Union, the oldest Soviet paper founded in 1912, Pravda, split into two different papers. Significant members of the main editorial staff (Viktor Afanasiev, Gennady Seleznev, Yuri Zhukov, Vera Tkachenko and Vadim Gorshenin) left Pravda to form the online news and opinion website Pravda.ru. Following a court case the Pravda name was allowed to be used by both the newspaper owned by the Communist Party of Russia and the Pravda.ru run by journalists associated with the defunct Soviet Pravda.

According to politologist Stanislav Belkovsky, Pravda.ru is controlled by Konstantin Kostin and his wife Olga Kostina. The Russian politician, Sergey Veremeenko also holds interests in Pravda.ru and Pravda International. Pravda.ru was registered in November 1999 and has been published since January 27, 1999. Pravda.ru also launched an English version (english.pravda.ru), a Portuguese version, as well as an Italian version. The printed version was registered by the Ministry of the Russian Federation for Press, TV and Radio Broadcasting and Mass Communications on 17 November 2003.

In 2007 Pravda.ru was classified as a popular leftist, nationalist news website by the Federation of American Scientists.

McCain controversy 
In 2013, after Russian President Vladimir Putin published an op-ed in The New York Times in support of Syrian President Bashar al-Assad, US senator John McCain announced that he would publish a response article in Pravda, referring to the newspaper owned by the Communist Party of the Russian Federation. McCain, however, eventually published his op-ed in Pravda.ru. This caused protests from the editor of communist Pravda Boris Komotsky and a response from the editor of Pravda.ru Dmitry Sudakov: Komotsky claimed that "there is only one Pravda in Russia, it is the organ of the Communist Party, and we have heard nothing about the intentions of the Republican senator" and dismissed Pravda.ru as an "Oklahoma-City-Pravda", while Sudakov derided Komotsky, claiming that "the circulation of the Communist Party Pravda is like a factory newspaper of AvtoVAZ from the Soviet times". McCain later attempted to publish his op-ed in the Communist Pravda as well, but the paper refused to publish it "because it was not aligned to the political positions of the Communist Party of the Russian Federation".

Controversy
The organization has been accused of supporting the Russian government's position on various subjects both within and outside the country and also of producing neo-Soviet, Russian nationalist news and outright conspiracy theories. The media outlet which is a part of a larger pro-Kremlin media holding is said to have created an algorithm for vetting media outlets in terms of their pro-government ideological standing.

Pravda.ru has been known to produce tabloid style articles with outrageous claims in the headline, such as
 “Aliens forced Americans out from the Moon”, 
 "Time machine built in Europe, Russian scientists say",  
 “Time can be turned back”, 
 “Alien and human skulls found on Mars”, 
 "Nuclear strike hits Yemen", 
 “Boriska, boy from Mars, says that all humans live eternally”,
 "Autotrophs: new kind of humans appears who neither drink nor eat" 
 “Nazi Germany achieved its technological advantage with aliens’ help”.
 "The decision on Kyiv has been made: it will be destroyed so that the Russians do not get it" 

According to former State Duma deputy Boris Nadezhdin, Pravda.Ru is “a pro-Kremlin site that has been coming down on the opposition all the time”; according to Vladimir Pribylovsky, the site is maintained by the Department of Internal Policy of the Presidential Administration of the Russian Federation.

In 2005, one of the correspondents of Pravda.ru was involved in the story of the attack of "Nashi" on the headquarters of the National Bolshevik Party.

References

External links
 www.pravda.ru (Russian)
 port.pravda.ru (Portuguese)

Russian news websites
1999 establishments in Russia
Privately held companies of Russia